Anna L. Peterson (born 1963) is an American scholar of religious studies who is currently a professor in the Department of Religion at the University of Florida, where she has worked since 1993. Her research variously concerns religion in Latin America and ethics—including religious ethics, Christian ethics, environmental ethics, animal ethics and social ethics. She is the author of five monographs: Martyrdom and the Politics of Religion (State University of New York Press, 1997); Being Human (University of California Press, 2001); Seeds of the Kingdom (Oxford University Press, 2001); Everyday Ethics and Social Change (Columbia University Press, 2009); and Being Animal (Columbia University Press, 2013).

Career
Peterson studied at Williams College (1981–1983) before going on to receive a religious studies BA from the University of California at Berkeley (1983–1985). She then studied at the University of Chicago Divinity School from 1986 to 1991. She received an MA in 1987, and a PhD in Ethics and Society in 1991. Her doctoral thesis was supervised by Robin Lovin. She became an assistant professor in religious studies at St. Norbert College in 1991, where she remained until 1993, when she took up the position of assistant professor at the University of Florida Department of Religion. In 1997, her Martyrdom and the Politics of Religion was published with State University of New York Press. The book blends theology, social history and ethnographic anthropology to explore ideas of Catholic martyrdom in the Salvadoran Civil War. She became an associate professor in 1998, and spent two years as a visiting fellow at the Wesleyan University Department of Religion. 2001 saw the publication of her Being Human, a book about environmental ethics from the perspective of religious ethics. In 2002, she became a full professor.

Peterson has published a number of books while a full professor at Florida. Seeds of the Kingdom, a comparative study of United States Amish farming communities and of El Salvador's refugee communities, appeared in 2005. Both groups examined, Peterson argues, attempt to build utopian Christian communities. Everyday Ethics and Social Change was published in 2009. In this book, Peterson argues that humans should the extend ethical values dominant in interpersonal relationships, such as love, to differently structure currently instrumental societal and political relationships. 2011 saw the publication of Working Toward Sustainability: Ethical Decision-Making in a Technological World, a textbook which Peterson co-authored with Charles J. Kibert, Martha C. Monroe, Richard R. Plate and Leslie Paul Thiele. In 2013's Being Animal, Peterson critiques the separation of environmental and animal ethics. Though frequently thought irreconcilable, Peterson argues that the separation can be blamed on a weak understanding of nature, humans, and animals, as well as the relationships between them.

Selected bibliography
In addition to her books, Peterson has written over twenty articles published in peer reviewed academic journals and scholarly edited collections, as well as various review articles, book reviews and encyclopedia articles.

Peterson, Anna L. (1997). Martyrdom and the Politics of Religion: Progressive Catholocisim in El Salvador's Civil War. Albany, New York: State University of New York Press.
Peyerson, Anna L., Manuel A. Vásquez, and Philip J. Williams, eds. (2001). Christianity, Social Change, and Globalization in the Americas. New Brunswick, New Jersey: Rutgers University Press.
Peterson, Anna L. (2001). Being Human: Ethics, Environment, and Our Place in the World. Berkeley, California: University of California Press.
Peterson, Anna L. (2005). Seeds of the Kingdom: Utopian Communities in the Americas. Oxford: Oxford University Press.
Peterson, Anna L., and Manuel A. Vásquez, eds. (2008). Latin American Religions: Histories and Documents in Context. New York: New York University Press.
Peterson, Anna L. (2009). Everyday Ethics and Social Change: The Education of Desire. New York: Columbia University Press.
Kibert, Charles J., Martha C. Monroe, Anna L. Peterson, Richard R. Plate and Leslie Paul Thiele (2012). Working Toward Sustainability: Ethical Decision Making in a Technological World. Hoboken, New Jersey: John Wiley and Sons.
Peterson, Anna L. (2013). Being Animal: Beasts and Boundaries in Nature Ethics. New York: Columbia University Press.
LeVasseur, Todd, and Anna Peterson, eds. (2016) Religion and Ecological Crisis: The "Lynn White Thesis" at Fifty. New York: Routledge.

References

External links
Anna L. Peterson at the University of Florida

1963 births
Living people
Religious studies scholars
American ethicists
Animal ethicists
Environmental ethicists
University of Florida faculty
Williams College alumni
University of California, Berkeley alumni
University of Chicago Divinity School alumni
Women and religion
Philosophers from California
Philosophers from Florida